Quercus pringlei is a species of oak native to northeastern Mexico.

Description
Quercus pringlei is a shrub or small tree, which generally grows from .5 or 1 to 4 meters tall, and occasionally up to 10 meters tall.

Range and habitat
Quercus pringlei is native to the Sierra Madre Oriental and the isolated mountain ranges of the southern Mexican Plateau, from 1,500 to 2,400 meters elevation, in the states of Coahuila, Durango, Hidalgo, Nuevo León, Querétaro, San Luis Potosí, Tamaulipas, and Zacatecas.

It is found in submontane scrub, which can range from sparse to dense, and into montane oak and pine–oak forest at higher elevations. It is commonly found with the oaks Quercus intricata, Quercus invaginata, and Quercus pungens, and with Pinus cembroides, Juniperus saltillensis, Juniperus pinchotii, Quercus intricata, and Quercus striatula.

When its native forests are degraded by deforestation, fire, and/or overgrazing, it is often replaced by sparse or dense chaparral, with Q. striatula, Agave gentryi, Piptochaetium fimbriatum, and other plants characteristic of lower-elevation xerophilous scrub communities.

References

pringlei
Endemic oaks of Mexico
Flora of the Sierra Madre Oriental
Flora of the Mexican Plateau
Plants described in 1900